Henry James Marris-McGee (14 May 1929 – 28 January 2006) was a British actor, best known as straight man to Benny Hill for many years. McGee was also often the announcer on Hill's TV programme, delivering the upbeat intro "Yes! It's The Benny Hill Show!". He was familiar to British children throughout the 1970s as "Mummy" in the Sugar Puffs commercials, the catchphrase of which was "Tell them about the honey, Mummy".

Biography
Born in South Kensington, London, and educated at Stonyhurst College, McGee hoped to become a doctor, but the death of his father when he was 17 put financial strains on the family that ended his plans. Having enjoyed acting as a boy, McGee decided to follow his mother's side of the family, which could trace its involvement in acting back to Kitty Clive. He went on to play supporting roles in films and television series and dramas, including The Italian Job (1969), The Saint and The Avengers, but it is for comedy roles that he is best remembered, primarily and most famously for his straight man interviewer in The Benny Hill Show. He was also remembered by some as the 'mummy' of Honey Monster, a large, yellow, furry creature in advertisements for the breakfast cereal Sugar Puffs. 

McGee played Two-Ton Ted in the video of "Ernie (The Fastest Milkman In The West)". Other comedy roles included the holiday centre manager in the 1973 film Holiday on the Buses, officious policemen in Adventures of a Taxi Driver (1976) and Revenge of the Pink Panther (1978), the TV presenter Harold Hump in Carry On Emmannuelle (1978), opposite Charlie Drake in the ATV/ITV situation comedy The Worker (1965–1978), and There Was An Englishman, An Irishman and a Scotsman, a BBC Scotland comedy series written by Lew Schwarz. McGee was the Englishman, with Harry Towb as the Irishman and Roy Kinnear as the Scot. The show ran for one series in 1972. He also appeared in an episode of Rising Damp as a conman, Seymour. In 2003, he appeared in the episode "The Miraculous Curing of Old Goff Helliwell" in Last of the Summer Wine. He had a long and successful theatre career, during which he tackled a wide range of roles, receiving plaudits for deadpan delivery in farces such as Plunder.

Personal life
McGee had one daughter, Stephanie (born November 1963). He spent his last six months in a nursing home, suffering from Alzheimer's disease. He is buried at Brompton Cemetery, London.

Filmography

External links

References

1929 births
2006 deaths
English male stage actors
English male television actors
People from South Kensington
Burials at Brompton Cemetery
People educated at Stonyhurst College
Deaths from dementia in England
Deaths from Alzheimer's disease
Male actors from London
20th-century English male actors